1991 Empress's Cup Final was the 13th final of the Empress's Cup competition. The final was played at Nishigaoka Soccer Stadium in Tokyo on March 26, 1992. Suzuyo Shimizu FC Lovely Ladies won the championship.

Overview
Suzuyo Shimizu FC Lovely Ladies won their 1st title, by defeating Yomiuri SC Beleza 3–1.

Match details

See also
1991 Empress's Cup

References

Empress's Cup
1991 in Japanese women's football